Brodie Haldeman Greer (born October 26, 1949) is a former American actor, best known for his role as Officer Barry "Bear" Baricza on CHiPs.

Early life
Greer was raised in Pacific Palisades, Los Angeles, California. He studied at Santa Monica Junior College and San Jose State University. At San Jose State, Greer played at safety for the San Jose State Spartans football team from 1969 to 1971.

Career
Greer's first major role was on Days of Our Lives, but his most notable role was Officer Barry "Bear" Baricza on CHiPs. Greer appeared in 53 episodes between 1977 and 1982, he also reprised his role in the reunion special CHiPs '99. 

Greer was a feature player in The Love Boat episode Abby's Maiden Voyage, which aired February 26, 1983.

In 2010 Greer went into semi-retirement. Today, Greer coaches volleyball and basketball for middle and high schools in Carmel, California.

Filmography
CHiPs (1977-1982, TV Series) - Officer Barry Baricza
Death Flash (1986) - Carl Sloan
Terror Squad (1988) - Capt. Steiner
True Blood (1989) - Det. Tony Williams
Ministry of Vengeance (1989) - Whiteside's Liaison
CHiPs '99 TV movie (1998) - Barry 'Bear' Baricza

References

External links

1949 births
Living people
Male actors from Santa Monica, California
American male television actors
San Jose State Spartans football players
American football safeties
Santa Monica Corsairs football players